Huddersfield Town's 2003–04 campaign was their first competitive campaign in the bottom division since the 1979–80 season. Huddersfield secured a return to the third tier (to be then called Football League One), at the first attempt, by beating Mansfield Town, on penalties, in the Playoff Final on 31 May 2004 at the Millennium Stadium.

Squad at the start of the season
The squad at the start of the season was mainly depleted. When Peter Jackson took over in late June 2003, there were only 8 players on the official list of registered players, because of the mass clear-out caused by Town going into administration the previous season.

Review
Peter Jackson began his second spell as Huddersfield manager in the summer of 2003 as the Terriers came out of administration under the new ownership of Ken Davy. He again wasted no time in installing Yorath as his assistant. With only eight players turning up to his first training session, and star player Martin Smith defecting to Northampton Town, many supporters would have been happy to see the side consolidate and not slip any further down the league. But some shrewd signings (including Rob Edwards, Tony Carss, Efe Sodje, Steve Yates and goalkeeper Ian Gray), the emergence of a talented group of youngsters, and the prolific form of the previously ineffective Jon Stead made Town among the early pace-setters for the Division. As winter approached, Jackson's young side became more inconsistent and seemed to be fading but a change of formation tightened up the defence. Goalkeeper Paul Rachubka was brought in as the side found a new resilience and the ability to grind out narrow victories. Stead's form saw an offer from Sunderland, that was rejected, but he was snapped up by Premiership Blackburn Rovers for around £1.2 million in January and was replaced by Polish U21 striker Pawel Abbott who had been unable to establish himself at Preston North End.

It took Huddersfield until the end of August to register their first league win of the season in Division 3 (a 2–1 win against Bristol Rovers at the McAlpine Stadium), but they managed to knock out Division 1 side Derby County in the first round of the League Cup and then amazingly beat Sunderland 4–2 in the second round at the Stadium of Light. They then went on a 4-game winning streak, before hitting a bad patch, when they won only one game in 7, including losing in all three cup competitions (1–0 to Reading in the League Cup, 2–0 to Carlisle United in the Football League Trophy & 1–0 to Accrington Stanley in the FA Cup live on BBC One). Then after beating leaders Hull City 3–1, they went on a good run which came to a dramatic halt when they lost 4–0 to Macclesfield Town at Moss Rose. They then went on another good run throughout January 2004, but then they lost their talisman Jon Stead, who was sold to Premier League side Blackburn Rovers for £1.3 million.

With only Andy Booth as a proper striker, Town loaned Preston North End striker Pawel Abbott, who scored 4 goals in his 6 games, they then signed him on a permanent deal for £125,000 and Huddersfield continued their climb up the table and with only 2 games to go, Huddersfield only needed to win one of their last team games to virtually guarantee automatic promotion to Division 2. But on 1 May, they lost their final home game to Mansfield Town 3–1, meaning they had to beat Cheltenham Town at Whaddon Road to ensure automatic promotion ahead of Torquay United. At half-time, all was going well, Huddersfield were 1–0 up thanks to Andy Booth's 100th goal for the club. But then disaster struck when Abbott received the ball just inside his own half and, inexplicably, ran back towards Town's goal and horrendously under hit a backpass that allowed the Robins to equalise with just 15 minutes of the game left. This, together with Torquay's win at Southend United, condemned the Terriers to a Play-Off spot, by virtue of an inferior goal difference.

The Play-off semi-final saw Town escape two bruising encounters with Lincoln City with goals from Danny Schofield and Rob Edwards staving off a spirited Lincoln fightback in the second leg, so Town went through 4–3 on aggregate. In the final at the Cardiff's Millennium Stadium, Town rode their luck against a Mansfield Town side who had hit three in each league meeting of the sides. Just before the end of normal time the Stags netted but the linesman controversially ruled that the initiating cross had gone out over the by-line.  A penalty shoot-out then followed, which Town won 4–1, saw Town home and out of Division Three at the first attempt, securing their place in the newly named Football League One.

Squad at the end of the season

Results

Pre-season matches

Division Three

Division 3 Play-offs

Playoff Final

FA Cup

Carling Cup

Football League Trophy

Appearances and goals

Huddersfield Town A.F.C. seasons
Huddersfield Town F.C.